Aphomia grisea is a species of snout moth in the genus Aphomia. It was described by Turati in 1913, and is known from Sardinia.

Taxonomy
It is sometimes listed as a synonym of Aphomia sociella.

References

Moths described in 1913
Tirathabini
Moths of Europe
Endemic fauna of Sardinia